Winchester-on-the-Severn is a populated place located in Anne Arundel County, Maryland, United States.

Etymology
Winchester-on-the-Severn is tied with Washington-on-the-Brazos, Texas for the title of longest hyphenated placename in the United States appearing in the USGS's Geographic Names Information System, each name consisting of 21 letters.

References

External links

Populated places in Anne Arundel County, Maryland